James Yorke (9 March 1730 – 26 August 1808) was a British clergyman.

Yorke was the son of Philip Yorke, 1st Earl of Hardwicke and Margaret Cocks.

He was educated at Newcome's School, proceeding in 1748 to Corpus Christi College, Cambridge (M.A. 1752, D.D. 1770).

Career
Yorke served as Rector of Great Horkesley, Essex, 1754–1756.

In 1756 he was appointed Canon of the tenth stall at St George's Chapel, Windsor Castle, a position he held until 1762.

He was Dean of Lincoln 1762–1781, Bishop of St David's from 1774 to 1779, Bishop of Gloucester from 1779 to 1781 and then Bishop of Ely from 1781 to 1808.

In 1793 he sought statutory powers  to sell  the bishop's palace and grounds in Wisbech. The Bill passed despite the opposition of Sir James Ayre and the premises were sold by auction in the same year to Joseph Medworth. Eyre was son-in-law of Henry Southwell of Bank House, Wisbech, Isle of Ely a member of the family tenanting the castle, and to that extent an interested party.

Family
On 29 June 1762, Yorke married Mary Maddox, daughter of Isaac Maddox, the Bishop of Worcester. They had several children, including:
Joseph Yorke (1765–1830), married Catherine Cocks, niece of Charles Cocks, 1st Baron Somers, and became father of Joseph Yorke, politician
Rev. Philip Yorke (1770–1817), married Hon. Anna Maria Cocks, daughter of the 1st Baron Somers, and became father of Philip James Yorke, soldier and scientist

He was buried at Forthampton, Gloucestershire. His memorial is designed by Robert Blore of Piccadilly.

References

1730 births
1808 deaths
Bishops of Ely
Bishops of Gloucester
Bishops of St Davids
Deans of Lincoln
Younger sons of earls
18th-century Church of England bishops
19th-century Church of England bishops
James
People educated at Newcome's School
Alumni of Corpus Christi College, Cambridge
Canons of Windsor
18th-century Welsh Anglican bishops